This is a list of children's museums in the United States.

See also
 Children's museum
 Science museum
 List of nature centers in the United States

References

 
Children's